Sri Lankan New Zealanders , also known informally as “Sriwis”, are New Zealanders of Sri Lankan heritage living in New Zealand. This includes at least three Sri Lankan ethnic groups in New Zealand: the Sinhalese, Sri Lankan Tamil and Burghers. Sri Lankans in New Zealand span over 140 years emigration. In 2013 there were 9,579 Sri Lankans in New Zealand and increased to 16,830 by 2018.

History

Early arrivals
The early arrivals who came to New Zealand from what was then British Ceylon were a few prospectors attracted to the gold rushes. By 1874 there were a mere 33 New Zealand residents born in Ceylon. Both New Zealand and Ceylon being part of the Commonwealth, New Zealand dutifully imported both people and commodities from Ceylon. After 1890, Ceylon began to surpass China as New Zealand’s supplier of tea. By 1901 the number of Ceylonese residents in New Zealand born in Ceylon had grown to 106.

20th century
After 1950, under the Colombo Plan, some students and trainees received education in New Zealand. Up until the late 1960s the number of New Zealand residents born in Ceylon remained static. As the demand for skilled professionals in New Zealand grew, it led to a noticeable increase in the number of immigrants around this time. Racial and economic tensions in Dominion of Ceylon, made worse after the declaration of the republic in 1972, also swelled immigrant numbers.

In 1983 the Sri Lankan Civil War began with Sinhalese political dominance being challenged by the militant Tamil Tigers, who sought a separate Tamil state within Sri Lanka. After the 1983 riots in Sri Lanka ushered in an extended civil war, many Sri Lankans, both Tamil and Sinhalese, fled Sri Lanka, and the number of arrivals from Sri Lanka to New Zealand and the Sri Lankan-born population in New Zealand rose dramatically.

Present
As during the 1980s New Zealand had relaxed its immigration policies towards Asians, it was seen as a welcoming destination and convinced them to emigrate permanently. Other Sri Lankans only found temporary employment in Africa and Saudi Arabia, intending to return to Sri Lanka. The number of arrivals continued to increase, and at the 2006 census there were over 7,000 Sri Lankans living in New Zealand. By the end of the 2018 census the Sri Lankan ethnic group population has increased to 16,830.

Demographics

There were 16,830 people identifying as being part of the Sri Lankan ethnic group (including Sinhalese and Sri Lankan Tamil) at the 2018 New Zealand census, making up 0.36% of New Zealand's population. This is an increase of 5,556 people (49.3%) since the 2013 census, and an increase of 8,517 people (102.5%) since the 2006 census. Some of the increase between the 2013 and 2018 census was due to Statistics New Zealand adding ethnicity data from other sources (previous censuses, administrative data, and imputation) to the 2018 census data to reduce the number of non-responses.

There were 8,082 females and 8,751 males, giving a sex ratio of 1.083 males per female. The median age was 32.9 years (compared with 37.4 years for New Zealand as a whole), with 3,411 people (20.3%) were aged under 15 years, 3,816 (22.7%) were 15 to 29, 8,247 (49.0%) were 30 to 64, and 1,362 (8.1%) were 65 or older.

In terms of population distribution, 59.3% of Sri Lankan New Zealanders lived in the Auckland region, 15.0% lived in the Wellington region, 13.1% lived in the remainder of the North Island outside, and 12.6% lived in the South Island. The Puketāpapa local board area of Auckland had the highest concentration of Sri Lankan people at 2.7%, followed by the Maungakiekie-Tāmaki local board area (1.3%) and the Whau and Ōrakei local board areas (both 1.2%). Lower Hutt City had the highest concentration of Sri Lankan people outside of Auckland at 0.8%. Seven districts recorded no Sri Lankan people in their respective areas: Great Barrier Island, Waitomo district, Kawerau district, Wairoa district, Tararua district, Buller district, and the Chatham Islands.

Out of the Asians, the Sri Lankans were the most likely to hold a formal qualification and to work in white-collar occupations. Sri Lankans mainly worked in health professions, engineering, business and property services, and the retail and manufacturing sectors, in large numbers. Most lived in Auckland and Wellington, with smaller populations in Waikato, Manawatū-Whanganui, Canterbury and others.

Community

Organizations
 New Zealand Society for Peace, Unity and Humam Rights in Sri Lanka Incorporated (SPUR NZ)
 New Zealand Sri Lanka Foundation
 Sri Lankan Society of New Zealand
 New Zealand Sri Lanka Friendship Society
 New Zealand Tamil Society
 Sri Lankaramaya - New Zealand
 United Sri Lanka Association Inc (USLA)

Culture 
Sri Lankan New Zealanders predominantly speak English, with Tamil and Sinhalese sometimes spoken at home. Distinct observations include Sriwi day, celebrated on 5 February between the national days of Sri Lanka and New Zealand. During this celebration both countries are honored through drinking Ceylon Tea with New Zealand milk and ritual ringing of the Tamil Bell .

Notable Sri Lankan New Zealanders

 Mayu Pasupati - New Zealand domestic cricketer
 Dr Anne Doloras Perera - Past President of United Sri Lanka Association (Auck) and Founder President of New Zealand Sri Lanka Foundation (1998)
 Kumar Velambalam - President of the New Zealand Sri Lanka Foundation
 Manjula Sanis Walgampola - President of the New Zealand Sri Lanka Foundation
 Jereeth Abdeen - President - Sri Lankan Society of New Zealand
 Ven. Walgama Sri Munidawansa Thero - Chief Sanghanayaka of New Zealand 
Rohana Ulluwishewa - Author
Brannavan Gnanalingam - Author 
 Ahi Karunaharan - Writer, director, actor and producer
 Vanushi Walters - MP and human rights lawyer
Jehan Casinader - Journalist and television presenter
Suranga Nanayakkara - Computer scientist and inventor

Media

Radio 

 Voice of Sri Lanka
 Sawana

Newspaper 

 Srilankanz community newspaper

See also
 Colombo Street
Colombo Plan

References

External links
 Te Ara – The Encyclopedia of New Zealand - Sri Lankans

Asian New Zealander
Immigration to New Zealand
 
Sri Lankan diaspora